Elizabeth-Jane Harris (born 7 January 1988) is a British professional racing cyclist who rides for Storey Racing. At the 2017 Matrix Grand Prix series Harris won round 5 in Croydon and took the Eisberg Sprints Jersey.

See also
 List of 2016 UCI Women's Teams and riders

References

External links
 

1988 births
Living people
British female cyclists
Place of birth missing (living people)
21st-century British women